Muhammad XI (died 1454) was the nineteenth Nasrid ruler of the Moorish Emirate of Granada in Al-Andalus on the Iberian Peninsula.

References 
Islamic Spain 1250 to 1500 by Leonard Patrick Harvey; University of Chicago Press, 1992

Sultans of Granada
15th-century monarchs in Europe
1454 deaths
Year of birth unknown
15th-century Arabs